Wellingborough railway station (formerly Wellingborough Midland Road) is a Grade II listed station located in the market town of Wellingborough in Northamptonshire, England. The station is operated by East Midlands Railway, which is also the primary operator serving the station with passenger services.

As well as Wellingborough itself, the station is also the closest to the towns of Higham Ferrers, Raunds, Irthlingborough and Rushden, although there is no direct public transport link from the station itself to any of these towns apart from Irthlingborough. It is also the nearest station to Rushden Lakes shopping centre.

Wellingborough station was used as a filming location for the film Kinky Boots, standing in for Northampton station. In late 2009, Wellingborough was made a Penalty fare station by East Midlands Trains, which means a valid ticket or permit to travel must be shown when requested.

History

A curve linked the two stations from west to north.

The buildings, designed by C. H. Driver, still exist, though in altered form.

Wellingborough also had a large locomotive depot with two roundhouses; the first built 1868 and the second in 1872. The 1872 building, known as No.2 Shed still exists, just to the north of the station at the far side of Mill Rd bridge. On 2 September 1898, the station was the scene of a serious rail accident, when a trolley ran off the platform in front of a Manchester express train. The crew and five passengers were killed and sixty-five injured.

British Rail removed the fourth track between Kettering and Sharnbrook Junction in the 1980s, for cost cutting reasons, making platform 4 unused. Work started in 2019 on rebuilding the platform in preparation for reopening and reinstatement of the fourth track.

There were originally five platforms at Wellingborough station - Platforms 1 & 2 still exist as they were, platform 3 was the bay platform for Northampton trains, which ceased on 4 May 1964. The bay is still there, but fenced off from platform 2.  In 1964, platform 4 (the then down slow platform) was re-numbered platform 3.  Platform 5 was taken out of use when the Rushden and Higham Ferrers services ceased in 1959.

Station Masters

George Renshaw 1867 - 1893
George Turner 1893 - 1908
Mr. A. Roper 1909 - 1930 (formerly station master at Finedon)
W.J. Wearn 1930 - 1937
Oscar Best 1937 - 1940 (afterwards stationmaster at Huddersfield)
V.L. Ward 1940 - 1943 (afterwards station master at Derby)
S. Curtis 1947 - ????
Albert Horsley 1953 - ????

General information
Wellingborough has four platforms. The station was formerly the junction for a branch to Higham Ferrers.

The station has the PlusBus scheme, where train and bus tickets can be bought together at a saving.

Services

Interchange with faster services at other times can be made at Kettering.

2tph to London St Pancras
2tph to  via Kettering

Travel times
Travel times to London, Corby, Melton Mowbray, Nottingham and Lincoln (from May 2009). All services are operated by East Midlands Railway.

51-5 mins to London St Pancras International
35 mins to 
35 mins to 
13 mins to 
7 mins to  
16 mins to 
39 mins to  Afternoon peak only
54 mins to  Afternoon peak only
17 mins to 
34 mins to 
46 mins to 
58 mins to 
1h 5 mins to 
2 hours to  Afternoon peak only

Development

Station improvements
As part of the Department for Transport's Access for all programme, Network Rail's Midland Main Line upgrade, and local housing developments, the station platforms have been upgraded, with improved accessibility access by providing lifts, replacing the flat barrow crossing at end of the platforms. In August 2010, the local council gave planning permission for Network Rail to build lifts and to fit new internal toilets one of the disused buildings in the station.

As a wider part of the Network Rail upgrade, the Midland Main Line between Bedford and Corby has been electrified, with the fourth track reinstalled between Sharnbrook Junction and Kettering, which resulted in the rebuilding and opening of Wellingborough's platform 4 in 2021. A station building on platform 4 is planned for access to the large Stanton Cross mixed-use development.

In March 2022, work to restore the platform canopies was completed.

Car parking

The new 'South' car park has been built as a replacement for the 'North' car park which is still open. The replacement was built because of the Wellingborough East (Stanton Cross) development, as a new road bridge would start where the 'North' car park is situated and then go over the railway.

References

External links

National Rail: Wellingborough (WEL) Station information
National Rail: Wellingborough (WEL) station plan
National Rail: Live departures, Wellingborough
East Midlands Trains: Wellingborough

Railway stations in Northamptonshire
DfT Category C2 stations
Railway stations in Great Britain opened in 1857
Former Midland Railway stations
Railway stations served by East Midlands Railway
Wellingborough
Charles Henry Driver railway stations
1857 establishments in England
Grade II listed buildings in Northamptonshire